Raja Paarvai is a 1981 Indian Tamil-language romance film directed by Singeetam Srinivasa Rao. The story was written by Kamal Haasan, for whom the film was his 100th as an actor and first as a producer. The score and soundtrack was composed by Ilaiyaraaja. Loosely based on the 1972 film Butterflies Are Free, it was simultaneously made and released as Amavasya Chandrudu in Telugu. Despite being a box office failure, the film received critical acclaim, and Haasan's performance won him the Filmfare Award for Best Tamil Actor. Thota Tharani made his debut as an art director with the film.

Plot 

Raghu is a blind violinist oppressed since infancy. Nancy, a Christian, is keen on chronicling Raghu's inspiring life as a visually impaired but independently living person. Their relationship blossoms into a romance that is supported by Nancy's grandfather. Nancy is eventually due to be married to another man selected by her father, but aided by her grandfather, escapes from the church and elopes with Raghu.

Cast

Production 
Raja Paarvai was the 100th film for Kamal Haasan as an actor, and first as producer. He also worked as a screenwriter. He produced the film along with his brothers Charuhasan and Chandrahasan under the banner Haasan Brothers. The film also marked the debut of art director Thota Tharani in Tamil cinema. It was simultaneously shot in Telugu as Amavasya Chandrudu, with principal photography for both versions taking place in 55 days. Among other locations, the film was also shot in Venus Studios. While the film is loosely based on the 1972 film Butterflies Are Free, the final scene which features Madhavi's character escaping from church in her wedding dress and joining Haasan, was inspired by The Graduate (1967). Haasan learnt violin required for the role.

Soundtrack 
The soundtrack was composed by Ilaiyaraaja, while the lyrics were written by Kannadasan, Vairamuthu and Gangai Amaran. The song "Andhi Mazhai" is set in the Carnatic raga known as Vasantha, and "Vizhi Oraththu" is set in Shubhapantuvarali. For the instrumental "Modern Concerto", Viji Manuel was the keyboardist (playing the piano on arpeggio mode), while V. S. Narasimhan was the violinist.

Release 
Raja Paarvai was released on 10 April 1981, and Amavasya Chandrudu on 29 August 1981. Despite receiving critical acclaim, the film was a box office failure, and Haasan had to work seven to eight years to recover from the loss he incurred. The 100 days celebration of the film was held at Chettiar Bungalow in AVM studio.

Reception 
Kalki, in its review of the Tamil version, called the story ordinary, but said the dialogues and Rao's direction polished the film and lauded Haasan's performance, adding that Prasad outshined everyone else. S. Shiva Kumar wrote in Mid-Day, "Some breath taking photography, slick editing and lilting music contribute in making Raja Parvai a clean and enjoyable movie". Reviewing the Telugu version, Gudipoodi Srihari of the magazine Sitara wrote that barring a few sequences, the film was fairly enjoyable yet inspirational. Haasan won the Filmfare Award for Best Tamil Actor.

Legacy 
Raja Paarvai attained cult status in Tamil cinema. In Encyclopaedia of Indian Cinema, Ashish Rajadhyaksha and Paul Willemen described Srinivasa Rao's direction and Haasan's performance as "unabashedly melodramatic, milking the hero's disability for all its worth" and that Rao's zooms and cutaways underlined by "rapid and awkward editing" were "fully in evidence". In 2010, Sify included Raja Paarvai in its list, "Kamal's most memorable romantic films", where it praised Haasan and Madhavi's onscreen rapport, the visuals and the climax. In 2017, Haasan named Amavasya Chandrudu (the Telugu version of the film) as one of his 70 most favourite films and considered it superior to Raja Paarvai.

Notes

References

Bibliography

External links 
 

1980s romance films
1980s Tamil-language films
1980s Telugu-language films
1981 films
1981 multilingual films
Films about blind people in India
Films directed by Singeetam Srinivasa Rao
Films scored by Ilaiyaraaja
Films with screenplays by Kamal Haasan
Indian multilingual films
Indian romance films